Czarna  is a village in Łańcut County, Subcarpathian Voivodeship, in south-eastern Poland. It is the seat of the gmina (administrative district) called Gmina Czarna.

The village has a population of 1,600.

References

Villages in Łańcut County